Naka may refer to:

Places in Japan
 Naka, Hyōgo, a former town in Hyōgo Prefecture
 Naka, Ibaraki, a city in Ibaraki Prefecture
 Naka, Tokushima, a town in Tokushima Prefecture
 Naka District, Ibaraki, a district in Ibaraki Prefecture
 Naka District, Kanagawa, a district in Kanagawa Prefecture
 Naka District, Shimane, a former district in Shimane Prefecture
 Naka District, Tokushima, a district in Tokushima Prefecture

People with the surname
, Japanese ice hockey player
 Yuji Naka (born 1965), video game designer

Others
 Na+/K+-ATPase, membrane bound enzyme used to maintain an electrochemical gradient
 "Naka", nickname of Japanese footballer Shunsuke Nakamura
 Japanese cruiser Naka
 Naka Benue Nigeria
 Naka-Kon, a Kansas City, Missouri-based anime convention

See also
 Naka River (disambiguation), rivers in Japan
 Naka-ku (disambiguation), city wards of Japan

Japanese-language surnames

zh:中